Gorhey is a commune in the Vosges department in Grand Est in northeastern France. As of 2015, the population of Gorhey was 180.

See also 
 Communes of the Vosges department

References 

Communes of Vosges (department)